is a Japanese tennis player.

Sakatsume has a career-high singles ranking by the WTA of 281, achieved on 28 November 2022, and a career-high WTA doubles ranking of 552, achieved on 3 October 2022.

Sakatsume made her WTA Tour main-draw debut at the 2022 Championnats Banque Nationale de Granby, after entering the singles tournament as a lucky loser.

ITF Circuit finals

Singles: 7 (4 titles, 3 runner–ups)

Doubles: 2 (1 title, 1 runner–up)

References

External links
 
 

2001 births
Living people
People from Niigata Prefecture
Sportspeople from Niigata Prefecture
Japanese female tennis players
21st-century Japanese women